Pseudodaphnella rufolirata is a species of sea snail, a marine gastropod mollusk in the family Raphitomidae.

Description
The length of the shell attains 9 mm, its diameter 3.5 mm.

The barely thick shell has an elongate-fusiform shape. It is white with red, fine thread-like lines. The apex is eroded, six whorls remaining. These are somewhat rounded and depressed at the suture. The numerous, slender, wavy, yellowish red longitudinal ribs are crossed in each whorl by 5 to 6 spiral lirae. The body whorl is depressed in the middle and then turning upright. The aperture is wide and oblong and white within. The wide siphonal canal is recurved. The outer lip is denticulate. The columella is upright. The sinus is subsutural, shallow and slightly open between the first and the third lirae.

Distribution
This marine species occurs off the Loyalty Islands; off Mactan Island, Philippines.

References

External links
 MNHN, Paris: specimen
  Kilburn, R. N. (2009). Genus Kermia (Mollusca: Gastropoda: Conoidea: Conidae: Raphitominae) in South African Waters, with Observations on the Identities of Related Extralimital Species. African Invertebrates. 50(2): 217–236
 

rufolirata
Gastropods described in 1897